Nick Costes (August 3, 1926 – March 24, 2003) was an American long-distance runner. He competed in the marathon at the 1956 Summer Olympics.

References

External links
 

1926 births
2003 deaths
Athletes (track and field) at the 1956 Summer Olympics
American male long-distance runners
American male marathon runners
Olympic track and field athletes of the United States
People from Farrell, Pennsylvania
Track and field athletes from Pennsylvania
20th-century American people